Expansionism refers to states obtaining greater territory through military empire-building or colonialism.

In the classical age of conquest moral justification for territorial expansion at the direct expense of another established polity (who often faced displacement, subjugation, slavery, rape and execution) was often as unapologetic as "because we can" treading on the philosophical grounds of might makes right.

As political conceptions of the nation state evolved, especially in reference to the inherent rights of the governed, more complex justifications arose. State-collapse anarchy, reunification or pan-nationalism are sometimes used to justify and legitimize expansionism when the explicit goal is to reconquer territories that have been lost or to take over ancestral lands.

Lacking a viable historical claim of this nature, would-be expansionists may instead promote ideologies of promised lands (such as manifest destiny or a religious destiny in the form of a Promised Land), perhaps tinged with a self-interested pragmatism that targeted lands will eventually belong to the potential invader anyway.

Theories

Ibn Khaldun wrote that newly established dynasties, because they have social cohesion or Asabiyyah, are able to seek "expansion to the limit."

The Soviet economist Nikolai Kondratiev theorized that capitalism advances in 50-year expansion/stagnation cycles, driven by technological innovation. The UK, Germany, the US, Japan and now China have been at the forefront of successive waves.

Crane Brinton in The Anatomy of Revolution saw the revolution as a driver of expansionism in, for example, Stalinist Russia, the United States and the Napoleonic Empire.

Christopher Booker believed that wishful thinking can generate a "dream phase" of expansionism such as in the European Union, which is short-lived and unreliable.

According to a 2023 study, important historical instances of territorial expansion have frequently happened because actors on the periphery of a state have acted without authorization from their superiors at the center of the state. Leaders subsequently find it difficult to withdraw from the newly captured areas due to "sunk costs, domestic political pressure, and national honor."

Examples

Every part of the world has experienced expansionism. The religious imperialism and colonialism of Islam started with the early Muslim conquests, was followed by the religious Caliphate expansionisms, and ended with the Partition of the Ottoman Empire. In the 15th and 16th centuries, the Ottoman Empire entered a period of expansion. The Ottomans ended the Eastern Roman Empire with the conquest of Constantinople in 1453 by Mehmed the Conqueror.

The militarist and nationalistic reign of Russian Czar Nicholas I (1825–1855) led to wars of conquest against Persia (1826–1828) and Turkey (1828–1829). Various rebel tribes in the Caucasus region were crushed. A Polish revolt in 1830 was ruthlessly crushed. Russian troops in 1848 crossed into Austria-Hungary to put down the Hungarian Revolt. Russification policies were implemented to weaken minority ethnic groups. Pan-Slavist solidarity led to further war with Turkey (the sick man of Europe) in 1853 provoked Britain and France into invading Crimea.

In Italy, Benito Mussolini sought to create a New Roman Empire, based around the Mediterranean. Italy invaded Ethiopia as early as 1935, Albania in early 1938, and later Greece.  Spazio vitale ("living space") was the territorial expansionist concept of Italian Fascism. It was analogous to Nazi Germany's concept of Lebensraum and the United States' concept of "Manifest Destiny". Fascist ideologist Giuseppe Bottai likened this historic mission to the deeds of the ancient Romans.

After 1937, Nazi Germany under Hitler laid claim to Sudetenland, unification (Anschluss) with Austria in 1938 and the occupation of the whole of the Czech lands the following year. After war broke out, Hitler and Stalin divided Poland between Germany and the Soviet Union. In a Drang nach Osten aimed at achieving Lebensraum for the German people, Germany invaded the Soviet Union in 1941.

Expansionist nationalism is an aggressive and radical form of nationalism that incorporates autonomous patriotic sentiments with a belief in expansionism. The term was coined during the late 19th century as European powers indulged in the Scramble for Africa, but it has been most associated with militarist governments during the 20th century including Fascist Italy, Nazi Germany, the Japanese Empire, and the Balkans countries of Albania (Greater Albania), Bulgaria (Greater Bulgaria), Croatia (Greater Croatia), Hungary (Greater Hungary), Romania (Greater Romania) and Serbia (Greater Serbia).

In American politics after the War of 1812, Manifest Destiny was the ideological movement during America's expansion West. The movement incorporated expansionist nationalism with continentalism, with the Mexican War in 1846–1848 being attributed to it. Despite championing American settlers and traders as the people whom the government's military would be aiding, the Bent, St. Vrain and Company stated to be the most influential Indian trading company prior to the Mexican War, underwent a decline because of the and of traffic from American settlers by Beyreis. The company also lost the partner Charles Bent on January 19, 1847, to a riot caused by the Mexican War. Many in the Cheyennes, Comanches, Kiowas, and Pawnees tribes died from smallpox in 1839–1840, measles and whooping cough in 1845, and cholera in 1849, which had been brought by American settlers. The buffalo herds, sparse grasses, and rare waters were also depleted following the war as increased traffic by settlers moving to California during the Gold Rush.

21st century

China

The People's Republic of China is accused of expansionism through its operations and claims in the South China Sea, which are concurrently claimed by Vietnam.

Israel
 	

Israel was established on reacquired lands under international law and a manifest of original ownership on May 14, 1948, after the end of World War II and the Holocaust. Its government has occupied the West Bank, the Gaza Strip, the Golan Heights, and the Sinai Peninsula since the Six-Day War, although the Sinai was later returned to Egypt.

Iran
Iran, the largest Shi'ite state, has extended its influence across the entire Middle East, including Iraq, Lebanon, Syria, Yemen and Afghanistan by arming local militias.

Russia

Russia under Vladimir Putin has had an aggressive posture since 2008, especially since 2014. Events associated with Russia are the 2008 Russo-Georgian War and Russia's occupation of South Ossetia and Abkhazia; the Russo-Ukrainian War, which began in 2014 with the Annexation of Crimea and the War in Donbas and escalated into the ongoing full-scale Russian invasion of Ukraine in 2022; and the military intervention in Syria.

Turkey

Turkey's foreign policy is characterized, especially since 2010s by an aggressive expansionism, irredentism and interventionism in the Eastern Mediterranean and the neighboring Cyprus, Greece, Iraq, Syria, as well as in Africa, including Libya, and Nagorno-Karabakh. Turkey has occupied foreign territories and stationed troops in them, following the 1974 Turkish invasion of Cyprus, the Turkish occupation of northern Syria since 2016 and the Turkish presence in northern Iraq since 2018.

United States

The US retains military bases in some of the sovereign countries that it once occupied on a notionally-voluntary basis, including in Germany, Italy, Japan, Greenland, Iceland, Iraq, and formerly in Afghanistan. Guantanamo Bay Naval Base is retained despite the protests of the Cuban government, and the US has military bases in various other countries with which it has allied.

Ideologies
In the 19th century, theories of racial unity evolved such as Pan-Germanism, Pan-Slavism, and Pan-Turkism and the related Turanism. In each case, the dominant nation (respectively, Prussia; the Russian Empire; and the Ottoman Empire, especially under Enver Pasha) used those theories to legitimise their expansionist policies.

In popular culture

George Orwell's satirical novel Animal Farm is a fictional depiction, based on Stalin's Soviet Union, of a new elite seizing power, establishing new rules and hierarchies, and expanding economically while they compromise their ideals.

Robert Erskine Childers's novel The Riddle of the Sands portrays the threatening nature of the German Empire.

Elspeth Huxley's novel Red Strangers shows the effects on local culture of colonial expansion into Sub-Saharan Africa.

See also
 American imperialism
 British Empire
 French colonial empire
 Colonialism
 Ethnic cleansing
 European colonization of the Americas
 Expansionist nationalism
 Greater Israel
 Irredentism
 List of irredentist claims or disputes
 Manifest Destiny
 Scramble for Africa, late 19th century

References

Further reading
 Abernethy, David B. The dynamics of global dominance: European overseas empires, 1415-1980 (Yale University Press, 2000).
 Darwin, John. After Tamerlane: the global history of empire since 1405 ( Bloomsbury, 2008).
 Edwards, Zophia, and Julian Go. "The Forces of Imperialism: Internalist and Global Explanations of the Anglo-European Empires, 1750–1960." Sociological Quarterly 60.4 (2019): 628–653.
 MacKenzie, John M. "Empires in world history: characteristics, concepts, and consequences." in The Encyclopedia of Empire (2016): 1-25.
 Wade, Geoff, ed. Asian Expansions: The Historical Experiences of Polity Expansion in Asia (Routledge, 2014).
 Wesseling, Hendrik. The European Colonial Empires: 1815-1919 (Routledge, 2015).

Political theories
Political history